Catharine Littlefield Greene (February 17, 1755 – September 2, 1814) was an American scientist who was the wife of the Continental Army general Nathanael Greene.  She was a mother of five, and noted for being a supporter of the inventor Eli Whitney. Her "extraordinary activity of mind, and tact in seizing on points, so as to apprehend almost intuitively, distinguished her through life. It enabled her, without apparent mental effort, to apply the instruction conveyed in the books she read, to the practical affairs of life".

Early life and the Revolutionary War
Catharine Littlefield was born on February 17, 1755, off the coast of Washington County, Rhode Island, on Block Island, where her family had settled in the 1660s. She was born into an upper class family; her father, John Littlefield, was a member of the Rhode Island legislature. Following the death of her mother at age 10, Catherine was sent to live with her aunt and uncle, both of whom were active in local government and acquainted her with its inner workings. While living with her aunt and uncle she received a formal education and lessons of domesticity. 

Beginning in 1772, she was courted by Nathanael Greene, a fellow Rhode Islander a dozen or so years her senior. The couple was married in July 1774, but less than a year later Greene was called to war. Catharine Greene had not yet settled into a comfortable life with her husband, as their home in Coventry, Rhode Island had not yet been completely furnished. Greene was energetic and independent, but she looked to her husband to take charge and make the decisions. With his involvement in the war, she assumed the role as head-of-household. 
	
Catharine Greene was not content to remain at home without her husband, so she joined Gen. Greene at his military headquarters whenever possible. Over the course of the war and shortly after, Catharine had five children who lived past infancy. Her husband being called into war was a great disturbance for Catherine and so she visited him often and formed a camaraderie with others he was stationed with. Her living conditions were relatively decent. She was often the one responsible for planning social events for the troops to have respite. She experienced the conflict of caring for her children while longing to be with her husband. She desperately wanted to have something like a normal family, and when conditions allowed, she brought her young children with her to camp. At other times she left them in the care of family or friends. It was during these separations that Catharine most felt the effects of the war upon her family.

When the war finally came to an end and the family was reunited, Greene looked forward to having Nathanael home to share in the responsibility of raising the children and handling business and household affairs. His presence at home "brought a peace of mind unknown to her since the conflict began." She was prepared to let her husband take charge and to settle herself into the life of a respected, well-to-do gentleman's wife.

During Nathanael's command in the South, he faced harsh conditions. In order to clothe his soldiers during the winter, he had to personally guarantee thousands of dollars to Charleston merchants. He later discovered that the speculator through whom he had dealt was fraudulent. At the end of the war, the merchants began pressing him for payment on the notes, and judgments came down from South Carolina courts. He was without sufficient funds and heavily in debt.
	
Catharine did not adjust well to the idea of being poor. Their side had won the war, but they had little to show for it. According to Stegeman, "her dream of wealth and leisure, once the war was over, had been shattered; she could no longer count on even the most basic security." Furthermore, Nathanael decided to move the family, in 1785, to a slave plantation on the Savannah River called Mulberry Grove, in Chatham County, Georgia, granted to him by the Georgia General Assembly in gratitude for his services during the war. Here, he hoped to make a living by cultivating rice, paying off their debts by selling their other lands when the markets proved favorable. This was particularly hard on his wife, who had lived her whole life in the north; she had to leave many friends and what was left of her family on Block Island.

She soon began to realize how heavily these burdens weighed on Nathanael. Catharine now saw before her a "tired, haggard ex-soldier who had given himself to a belief, had signed away his future life, in fact, for that cause." Catharine resolved to do everything in her power to help him. She settled into the arduous domesticity that plantation life required, determined to make Mulberry Grove a success. However, her plan was interrupted when Nathanael died suddenly on June 19, 1786 of sunstroke.

Recovering after Nathanael

After his death, Greene met the pressures of rearing her children and handling Nathanael's devastated finances. With the help of the new plantation manager, Phineas Miller (who had been her children's tutor), Mulberry Grove was thriving by 1788. At the urging of a trusted adviser, she personally presented to the United States Congress a petition for indemnity to recover funds that Nathanael had paid to Charleston merchants. On April 27, 1792, President George Washington approved and signed an act that indemnified the Greene estate.  In a happy letter to a friend, she wrote:

I can tell you my Dear friend that I am in good health and spirits and feel as saucy as you please - not only because I am independent, but because I have gained a complete triumph over some of my friends who did not wish me success - and others who doubted my judgement in managing the business and constantly tormented me to death to give up my obstinancy as it was called - they are now as mute as mice - Not a word dare they utter... O how sweet is revenge!

Role in Invention of Cotton Gin 
That same year, Catharine met a young man named Eli Whitney, who tutored her neighbor's children. With her encouragement he took up residence at Mulberry Grove to pursue his inventions. Within a year he had produced a model for the cotton gin.

In an 1883 article in The North American Review titled "Woman as Inventor", the early feminist and abolitionist Matilda Joslyn Gage claimed that Mrs. Greene suggested to Whitney the use of a brush-like component, which was instrumental in separating the seeds from the cotton. Gage provided no source for this claim, and to date there has been no independent verification of Catharine Greene's role in the invention of the gin.

Second marriage
Catharine Greene married Phineas Miller on June 13, 1796, in Philadelphia's First Presbyterian Church. The President and Martha Washington served as witnesses to the union.

Death 
Catharine Miller lived at Dungeness plantation until she died in 1814, where she was buried.

References

Sources 

Stegeman, Janet A. "Greene, Catharine Littlefield". American National Biography Online, Feb. 2000.
Stegeman, John F. and Janet A. Caty: A Biography of Catharine Littlefield Greene, Athens: Brown Thrasher Books, 1985.
Williams, Arden. Catharine Greene, The New Georgia Encyclopedia.
Roberts, Cokie. Founding Mothers, New York: HarperCollins, 2004.
Record of Pennsylvania Marriages Prior to 1810, Vol. 2, Baltimore: Genealogical Publishing Co., 1968.

Greene, Catharine Littlefield
Greene, Catharine Littlefield
Greene, Catharine Littlefield
People from New Shoreham, Rhode Island
People from Cumberland Island
18th-century women scientists
19th-century women scientists
Greene family of Rhode Island